The Wariʼ language (also Orowari, Wari, Pacaá Novo, Pacaás Novos, Pakaa Nova, Pakaásnovos) is the sole remaining vibrant language of the Chapacuran language family of the Brazilian–Bolivian border region of the Amazon. It has about 2,700 speakers, also called Wariʼ, who live along tributaries of the Pacaas Novos river in Western Brazil. The word wariʼ means "we!" in the Wariʼ language and is the term given to the language and tribe by its speakers.

Wariʼ is written in Latin script.

Dialects 
Wariʼ dialects listed by Angenot (1997):

Northern dialects
Wari’-Oro Waram
Wari’-Oro Mon
Wari’-Oro Waram Xijen

Southern dialects
Wari’-Oro Não
Wari’-Oro Eo
Wari’-Oro At
Wari’-Oro Jowin
Wari’-Oro Kao Oro Aje

Phonology 

None of the segments described below only occur in borrowed words or only in specific word classes. There are some sounds not listed which are only used in onomatopoeia and can violate the usual phonotactic and phonological constraints.

Consonants 
The Oro Nao dialect of Wariʼ as described by Everett & Kern (1997) has the following consonant phonemes. It is a relatively large inventory by Lowland Amazonian standards. The angled brackets represent the spellings associated with each sound.

 is a trilled affricate made up of a bilabial trill preceded by a dental stop, and is only reported from four other languages. In Oro Nao, this has been analysed as an allophone of /t/ that only occurs before /o/ and /y/ which does not occur in every idiolect. In some dialects it is a separate phoneme; however, only about 24 words contain the sound, some of which are onomatopoeic. It also is used more by older speakers of the language.

Consonant Alternations 

 /t͡ʃ/ can become , with a tendency to surface as [ʃ] more before unrounded vowels than rounded ones:  'he is thin' can be [t͡ʃaˈt͡ʃiʔ na] or [ʃaˈʃiʔ na].
 [m] can become  (a sequence of the bilabial nasal followed by the voiced bilabial stop) syllable initially, most frequently before /a/ but also before other vowels. The tendency to realise it as a sequence is greater if the syllable is stressed: its filth  can be [homiˈɾi] or [homᵇiˈɾi].
 [n] can become  (a sequence of the voiced alveolar nasal followed the voiced alveolar stop) syllable initially, most frequently before /a/ but also before other vowels. The tendency to realise it as a sequence is greater if the syllable is stressed: my head  can be [wiˈna] or [wiˈnᵈa].
 [j] can become  before /i/: let's go!  can be [maˈji] or [maˈʒi].
 [ʔj] can become [ʔd͡ʒ] word initially: I am afraid  can be [ˈʔjinʔ ʔiˌna] or [ˈʔd͡ʒinʔ ʔiˌna].

Vowels 
Wariʼ has one of the world's most asymmetrical vowel systems.  Vowels are generally expected to be somewhat evenly distributed in the vowel space, not bunched into a corner.  Additionally, vowels are expected to be unrounded when front and rounded when back until "gaps" in the vowel system have been filled. Although Wariʼ has only six vowels, four of these are close/close-mid front vowels, of which two are rounded (although  is uncommon). Non-native speakers have marked difficulty in distinguishing these front vowels, that contrast with only a single back vowel .

Vowel nasalisation occurs on diphthongs only; the few which are not nasalised all end in /i/. The following diphthongs occur in the Oro Nao dialect: [ẽĩ], [ãĩ], [aɪ], [õĩ], [oɪ], [ỹĩ], [ĩõ], [ẽõ], [ãõ].

Vowel Alternations 

  can become  in unstressed syllables if the vowel in the following syllable is : it is rocking  can be [pikiˈɾim na] or [pɪkɪˈɾim na].
 /e/ becomes  before all stops other than [ʔ], and in unstressed syllables in harmony with /e/ becoming  in the stressed syllable: day  is [t͡ʃɛk] because of the [k], and they went out  is [hʷɛɾɛˌhʷɛt maˈmaʔ naˌna] because the [t] in the stressed syllable causes /e/ to become  and the preceding ones change in harmony.
 /e/ becomes  before nasals, and in harmony with a /e/ becoming  in the stressed syllable: it is numb  is [tɪtɪˈɾɪn na].
  can become  in unstressed syllables when the vowel in the stressed syllable is not : its seed  can be [toˈkʷi] or [tʊˈkʷi].

Syllables 
The basic syllable in Wari' is CV(C), but suffixes can be of the form VC, VCVC or V. Only stops and nasals can occur in syllable codas. Consonant clusters are rare: /n/ is the only first segment found, and /t/, /k/ and /t͡ʃ/ are the only second segments found in non-compound words.

These have been analysed as single sounds, but apparently only to avoid complicating syllable structure. If these are separate phonemes, these clusters only occur word finally.

In the Oro Nao dialect, many consonants alternate with [ʔC] at the beginning of monosyllabic words, and  always precedes word initial semivowels ( and ), including in polysyllabic words. There is a correlation between words that begin [ʔC] in Oro Nao and words that begin [ʔaC] in other dialects. For example, 'water' is  [ʔkom] in Oro Nao and  [ʔaˈkom] in other dialects. Loss of this initial syllable is a potential explanation of why these words have variants that break the phonotactic rules. However, these generalisations do not always hold; for instance 'thorn'  [ʔpi] is pronounced the same in all dialects.

Stress 
The final syllable of words in major lexical categories is stressed. The verb tends to take the primary stress, with secondary stress on the others. However, emphasis of a particular word can cause transfer of the primary stress.

Morphology 
Wariʼ is a largely analytic language, which has almost no verbal inflection but many derivational processes.

Possession 
Wariʼ has two main classes of nouns, xiʼ nouns (named as such because their citation form ends with the suffix /-xiʼ/) and non-xiʼ nouns. Xiʼ nouns are inalienably possessed, and therefore have a paradigm of possession marking suffixes.

Some forms have allomorphs, especially when following stems that ends in the vowel [e], for instance -con becomes -cun and -cam becomes -quem.

There is also a paradigm of nominal inflectional clitics that inflect for person, number and third person gender. These are used to show possession of a non-xiʼ noun.

Most xiʼ nouns have alternate forms which cannot be possessed. To signify possession of these forms, the inalienable xiʼ counterparts must be used. For example, to convey the meaning 'his bone or leg', the xiʼ form of the noun (araxiʼ) with the third person masculine singular ending must be used. The nonpossessed form of the noun ('at) cannot be used with the third person masculine singular nominal inflectional clitic.

Reduplication

Verbs 
There is no affixation at all on verbs, but reduplication is used to mark aspect. Plural forms are derived by partial reduplication of the CV from the stressed syllable. This can either be a CV(CV) pattern, (where the second is optional) usually for transitive verbs: wac 'cut', wawac 'cut' (plural); cao' 'eat', cacacao''' 'eat' (plural). A CVrV pattern is usually used for intransitive verbs: cat 'break' (intr), caracat 'break' (plural). About a third of plural forms are derived by each of these types of reduplication, and the final third by suppletion.

 Nouns 
Reduplication of nouns can derive names or descriptive terms.

 Clitics 
Wariʼ has both verbal and nominal inflectional clitics, which are analysed as such and not affixes for a few reasons. Verbal inflectional clitics can occur as whole utterances as responses, as the referent is clear from the previous statement. They also do not undergo the phonological processes that is expected if they were suffixes to the main verb, for instance they do not take the primary stress, which the possessive suffixes do when they attach to xiʼ nouns.

Verbal inflectional clitics are inflected for person, number, tense, third person gender (only if tenseless), voice, and contain both the subject and the object of the verb. Where there is more than one object, the clitic represents one object based on the semantic roles present in the following hierarchy:
GOAL>CIRCUMSTANCE>THEME>BENEFACTIVE>COMITATIVE>LOCATION>TIME.

 Morphophonological Processes 
Wariʼ has three types of assimilatory process – regressive (or anticipatory), progressive (or preservative) and coalescent. This mainly occurs across word-initial morpheme boundaries.

Regressive assimilation occurs at morpheme boundaries involving consonants, where the consonant of the suffix causes a change in the consonant of the stem. This happens when xiʼ nouns with stems that end in -ji inflect for third person masculine or feminine, as the /k/ in the suffix causes the /y/ in the stem to become /ts/: taraji- 'ear' + -con '3sm' = taraxicon 'his ear'

Progressive assimilation occurs over morpheme boundaries between nasal consonants or diphthongs and voiceless stops. This type of assimilation is optional but common in normal speech, however does not seem to appear in careful speech: Mon te? 'Where is my father?' can be pronounced as either [mon'de] or [mon'te].

Coalescence is the most common assimilatory process, which is often accompanied by regressive vowel harmony. There are three principles which guide the output of vowel coalescence.

 If one of the two vowels is a back vowel, the output vowel will be a back vowel: xiri- 'house' + -u '1s' = xuru 'my house'
 The output vowel will have the height of the highest vowel of the two input vowels: toco- 'eye' + -um '2s' = tucum 'their eyes'
 If the input vowels are identical, the output vowel is identical (this only occurs with /i/+/i/ in the corpus collected by Everett and Kern (1997)).

 Syntax 
Basic constituent order in Wariʼ is deemed to be VOS, although it is uncommon to have multiple expressed constituents. Often arguments to the verb are indicated by the agreement affixes which form the verbal inflectional clitics, where the subject affix precedes the one for the object. A third person object or subject can either be overtly marked or just referenced in the inflectional clitic, first and second person can only be marked by the clitic. The conventions followed for glosses are those used by Everett & Kern (1997). In the examples given, the tense and mood is realis past/present, glossed as rp/p.

A verb can have up to four arguments, but it is uncommon to express more than one at a time. Instances of three or more arguments being expressed usually only come from elicited examples.

 COMP sentences 
COMP sentences are referred to as such by Everett and Kern (1996) because their initial position is occupied by what they refer to as a COMP or complementizer word. These give the sentence – or a variable in the sentence – a particular interpretation.

For a sentence to be a COMP sentence, it must have a COMP word in the initial position, an inflectional morpheme closely following which gives information about tense, mood, and sometimes gender, and a tenseless verbal inflectional clitic following the verb.

Here is a list of the COMP words found in the Oro Nao dialect.
{| class="wikitable"
!COMP word
!Morphological composition
!Function
!Example sentence
|-
|
|demonstrative 'that:prox:hearer'
|interrogation
|
|-
|
|ma+-on '3sm object'
|interrogation (masculine)
|
|-
|
|ma'''+-m '3sf object'
|interrogation (feminine)
|
|-
|
|ma+-in '3n object'
|interrogation (neuter)
|
|-
|
|verb 'to not exist'
|negation
|
|-
|
|verb 'list presentation'
|condition
|
|-
|
|preverbal modifier 'like'
|indication of resemblance
|
|-
|
|emphatic pronoun '3n'
|affirmation/interrogation
|
|-
|
|verb 'to be different'
|contraexpectation
|
|-
|
|demonstrative 'that neuter distal'
|interrogation
|
|-
|
|prepostition '3n'
|subordination
|
|}

Copular Sentences 
Wariʼ does not have a copula verb, so sentences that would use this instead have what would be the adjective become the verb.

Definiteness 
Wariʼ does not have any articles. Definiteness or indefiniteness can be expressed by either the use of demonstratives or verbal inflectional clitics containing the object. However this latter option does not always distinguish definiteness, as indefinite objects can also be marked in the inflectional clitics.

References 

 Mily Crevels (2012). Language Endangerment in South America: The Clock is Ticking In Lyle Campbell & Verónica Grondona. (Eds.).The indigenous languages of south america : A comprehensive guide. (pp. 167-234).
Daniel Everett and Barbara Kern (1997). Wariʼ: The Pacaas Novos language of western Brazil. London: Routledge.
 Peter Ladefoged and Daniel Everett (1996). The status of phonetic rarities. Language, 72 (4), 794-800.
 Margaret MacEachern, Barbara Kern, Peter Ladefoged (1996). "Wariʼ phonetic structures". In UCLA Working Papers in Phonetics 93: Fieldwork Studies of Targeted Languages IV.

External links 
Pacaas Novos (Intercontinental Dictionary Series)

Chapacuran languages